On 22 November 2022, at least ten Chadian soldiers were killed in an attack reportedly carried out by jihadist group Boko Haram. The attack occurred near Ngouboua in the Lake Chad area.

References 

2022 in Chad
2022 mass shootings in Africa
21st-century mass murder in Africa
Boko Haram in Chad
Islamic terrorist incidents in 2022
Mass murder in 2022
November 2022 crimes
November 2022 events in Africa
Terrorist incidents in Chad